Hydroxymethylpentylcyclohexenecarboxaldehyde is a synthetic fragrance known by the trade names Lyral, Kovanol, Mugonal, Landolal.  It is found in some soaps, eau de toilettes, aftershaves and deodorants.

Synthesis
Typical synthesis starts from myrcene and involves a Diels–Alder reaction with acrolein to produce the cyclohexenecarbaldehyde group, this species is marketed as a fragrance in its own right, most commonly under the name 'myrac aldehyde'. Acid-catalyzed hydration of this completes the synthesis by forming the tertiary alcohol.

Safety
Lyral is known to act as a skin allergen and is listed as such in EU Directive 76/768/EEC. It is commonly tested for in patients undergoing patch testing.

References

Perfume ingredients
Aldehydes
Tertiary alcohols
Cyclohexenes